Demokratia is a direct democracy, as opposed to the modern representative democracy.

It was used in ancient Greece, most notably Athens, and began its use around 500 BCE. In a participant government, citizens who wish to have a say in government can participate in it. Demokratia excluded women, foreigners, and slaves. It barred between 80 and 90 percent of the population from political rights.

The word demokratia comes from δῆμος  "people" and κράτος  "power": "the people hold power." Demos, including the lower classes, had political equality and not while respecting laws and institutions, was given full and absolute control of power and government."

In some languages, including Finnish and Italian, Demokratia is a word simply meaning democracy.

Quoted from MODERN AMERICA AND THE RELIGION OF DEMOCRACY (Internet archive) by Loren J Samons II:
In classical Athens, religion suffused every aspect of public life, from the theater to the military to the political assembly. The state (that is, the citizens) sponsored religious festivals and actively participated in the propitiation and worship of the gods. This fact well illustrates the way the various aspects of Athenian society — religious, political, economic, and social — overlapped with and affected one another, and the way every Athenian found himself set firmly within a matrix of duties to the gods, to his family, and to his fellow citizens. The principle of necessary duties (especially to protect the family, to serve the polis, and to propitiate the gods) formed the basic structure of Athenian society, and gave meaning to each religious, economic, military, and political act. In such an environment, it was impossible for the Athenians abjectly to worship a form of government, demokratia, even after they had made it a goddess. The idea that the "freedom to make choices" or "diversity" were absolute goods and thus could serve as goals or ideals (on a level with, much less above, family, gods, or polis) contradicted the very premises of Athenian society. Thus while democratic practices ultimately had a marked and deleterious effect on Athenian national strength and public morale and arguably contributed to the loss of Athenian independence, Athenian society managed to stave off the most harmful aspects of democratic theory. Even after they lost their democracy and autonomy, there is little evidence that the Athenians completely lost their fundamental conception of a society based on the principle of duties.

Notes

Literature
I. Morris & K. Raaflaub (ed.), Democracy 2500?: Questions and Challenges, Kendal/Hunt Publishing Co., 1998

References
MODERN AMERICA AND THE RELIGION OF DEMOCRACY (Internet archive) by Loren J Samons II Department of Classical Studies, Boston University. (Excerpted from What's Wrong With Democracy? Published by the University of California Press).
Direct democracy
Types of democracy